Esterina Olga Fiorini (13 January 1927 – 12 April 2022) was an Italian businesswoman and educator who founded the homonym professional school in Busto Arsizio (Province of Varese).

Honors

References 

1927 births
2022 deaths
20th-century Italian businesswomen
20th-century Italian businesspeople
Crafts educators
Italian educators
People from the Province of Verona